Emma Cline is an American writer and novelist, originally from California.  She published her first novel, The Girls, in 2016, to positive reviews. The book was shortlisted for the John Leonard Award from the National Book Critics Circle and the Center for Fiction's First Novel Prize. Her stories have been published in The New Yorker, Tin House, Granta and The Paris Review. In 2017 Cline was named one of Granta's Best of Young American Novelists, and Forbes named her one of their "30 Under 30 in Media". She is a recipient of the Plimpton Prize.

Life and career

Personal life 
Emma Cline, born in 1989, was raised in Sonoma County, California. As a young teenager, Cline had acting roles in When Billie Beat Bobby (2001) and a short film entitled Flashcards (2003). After graduating from Sonoma Academy at age 16, Cline attended Middlebury College in Vermont. During her first year at college, she won a writing award for her short story, "What is Lost". After graduating, Cline attended Columbia University where she received her MFA in 2013. While at Columbia University, she wrote "Marion", a short piece of fiction which was published by The Paris Review in their 2013 summer issue. A year later, The Paris Review selected Emma Cline to receive their annual Plimpton Prize for this same work, an award of $10,000. Since then, her writing has been published in multiple journals, and in 2016 she published The Girls, her debut novel.

The Girls 

Cline's first novel, The Girls, was published in 2016 by Random House Publishing. Cline was offered a $2 million advance by Random House, who outbid 11 other publishers for the novel. American film producer Scott Rudin bought the film rights to the book shortly before it was acquired by Random House. The novel is based in part on the Charles Manson cult and murders of the late 1960s. The story is told from the view point of Evie Boyd, a fourteen-year-old girl whose childhood is changed when she is introduced to a cult. Evie as an adult reflects on her actions as a child, bringing up questions of what it means to grow up as a girl and how injustice in the world can lead to terrible violence. While Cline is celebrated for her descriptive abilities and attention to gender structures, critics have also said that the cult setting seemed unnecessary to the novel and left the ending feeling unfulfilled. Still, the book was received well by the general public, and The Girls spent three months on The New York Times' best-seller list. It won the 2016 Shirley Jackson Award for Best Novel. The movie production for the novel is in the development stages.

Daddy 
Cline's short story collection, Daddy, was published in 2020 by Random House Publishing. The New York Times review called Cline "an astonishingly gifted stylist."

Other endeavors 
Cline is the co-founder, along with Peter Mendelsund, of Picture Books, an imprint of Gagosian Gallery.

Copyright lawsuit 
In February 2017, Emma Cline's former boyfriend, Chaz Reetz-Laiolo, accused Cline of plagiarizing his work for her novel The Girls. Reetz-Laiolo, who is also a writer, said that Cline installed a spyware program on his computer in order to read his personal work and emails without his consent.

Chaz Reetz-Laiolo's team indicated that unless Cline was willing to pay reparations for copyright, a public court filing would be made which included sexually explicit images and text messages of Emma Cline that were acquired by Reetz-Laiolo. In October 2017, the firm redrafted their initial request and withdrew all of the sexually explicit material of Cline.

Cline responded to the allegations with a countersuit, arguing that the reason she installed spyware was for her own protection and to see if Reetz-Laiolo was cheating on her. She said that he had been physically and emotionally abusive during their previous relationship. In regards to the plagiarism accusation, Cline's case considered the cited similarities between Reetz-Laiolo's work and The Girls to be minimal, stating that many were only one or two word phrases. Random House issued a statement saying they stood in full support of Emma Cline, and believed her to be a victim in the case.

In late November 2017, Reetz-Laiolo and Cline officially filed their lawsuits in federal court in San Francisco.

In June 2018, the copyright claim was dismissed with prejudice by Judge William Orrick, who said the similarities between the works were general and not protectable: "Both stories are ‘coming of age’ tales of sorts. But they vary significantly in detail, breadth and texture." In a hearing, Judge Orrick condemned the actions of Reetz-Laiolo's lawyers, calling their behavior "remarkably offensive."

Awards
 O. Henry Award, 2021
 Best Young American Novelists, Granta, 2017
 Shirley Jackson Award, 2016
 Plimpton Prize, The Paris Review, 2014

Bibliography

Books

Short fiction

Essays

Anthology 
 The Best American Short Stories 2020
 The Best American Short Stories 2018
 The Best American Short Stories 2017
 The Unprofessionals: New American Writing from The Paris Review

References

Living people
21st-century American novelists
Middlebury College alumni
Columbia University School of the Arts alumni
American women novelists
21st-century American women writers
Novelists from California
American women short story writers
21st-century American short story writers
People from Sonoma County, California
Year of birth missing (living people)